RainFurrest is a defunct furry convention located in Seattle. It was created to replace Conifur Northwest. It is particularly notable for multiple repeated incidents and managerial failures.

Locations and attendances by year 

Rainfurrest 2013 was the fifth furry convention to surpass 2000 attendees.

Incidents 
According to Fred Patten, there was discussion online among the furry community about the destructive behavior at RainFurrest 2015, with there being reports of vandalism, multiple visits by the police, and a number of arrests.  Reasons for the arrests included assault, sexual assault, and drug possession.

Then organizers released a letter to attendees, claiming that "For the last few years, the Hilton sustained more damage during RainFurrest than it did from every other event at the Hilton the entire rest of the year." The Hilton terminated their contract as a result of this behavior, and RainFurrest 2016 was cancelled after the organizers were unable to find a suitable alternative venue.

References

External links
WikiFur

Conventions in Washington (state)
Defunct furry conventions
Events in Seattle
Recurring events disestablished in 2015
Recurring events established in 2007